The men's 1500 metres event at the 2005 Asian Athletics Championships was held in Incheon, South Korea on September 2.

Results

References
Results

2005 Asian Athletics Championships
1500 metres at the Asian Athletics Championships